The Indian Army Corps of Engineers has distinguished itself in battle and has been awarded many battle and theatre honours. These honours have been awarded to individual units of the Corps or to the three Groups, namely the Madras Sappers, the Bengal Sappers and the Bombay Sappers. This list is a union of the battle and theatre honours awarded to these three groups of the Corps of Engineers and does not include those earned by disbanded engineer and pioneer units or corps.

Prior to World War I
 Carnatic (1780 - 84)
 Carnatic (1790 - 92)
 Sholinghur (1781)
 Mysore (1789 - 91)
 Seringapatam (1799)
 Egypt 1801 (Battle honour)
 Assaye [1803] 
 Bhurtpore [1805] 
 Java [1811] 
 Nagpore [1817] 
 Meheidpoor [1817] 
 Beni Boo Alli (1821) 
 Ava [1824 - 26]
 Afghanistan 1839
 Ghuznee 1839 
 Khelat [1839] 
 China [1840 - 42] 
 Cabool 1842 
  Meanee [1843] 
  Hyderabad 1843  
  Ferozeshah [1845]  
  Sobraon [1846]  
 Punjaub [1848 - 49] 
 Mooltan [1848 - 49] 
 Goojerat [1849] (Battle honour)
 Pegu [1852 - 53]  
 Persia [1856 - 57]  
 Reshire [1856]  
 Bushire [1856]  
 Koosh - Ab [1856]  
Delhi 1857  
 Relief and Capture of Lucknow [1857]  
 Central India [1857]  
 Pekin 1860  
 Taku Forts [1860]  
 Abyssinia (1867)
 Afghanistan 1878–80  
 Ali Masjid [1878]  
 Charasiah [1878]  
 Kabul 1879  
 Ahmad Khel [1880]  
 Kandahar 1880  
 Egypt 1882  
 Tel-el-Kebir [1882] 
 Suakin [1885]  
 Tofrek [1885] 
 Burma 1885–87 
 Chitral 1895  
 Malakand 1897  
 Punjab Frontier [1897 - 98]  
 Tirah [1897 - 98]  
 China 1900  
 Somaliland 1901-04

References

External links
Globalsecurity
official website

Indian Army Corps of Engineers
Battle honours of the Corps of Engineers